{{Infobox video game
| title       = Diep.io
| collapsible =
| image       = Diepio mobile logo.webp
| caption     = Diep.ios old mobile icon
| publisher   = Miniclip (Mobile, 2016 - 2022)Addicting Games (Mobile, 2022 - present)
| platforms   = Browser, Android, iOS
| released    = Android, iOS2016
| genre       = Action
| modes       = Multiplayer
| designer    = Matheus Valadares
}}Diep.io''' is a multiplayer action game available for web browsers, Android, and iOS, created by Brazilian developer Matheus Valadares. Players control tanks and earn points by destroying shapes and killing other players in a 2D arena. The mobile version of the game was released in 2016 by Miniclip. In 2021, it was acquired by the gaming website Addicting Games.

Gameplay
In Diep.io, the main objective for the player is to earn points by destroying different polygon objects and killing other players by firing bullets with their tank. By earning points, the tank levels up. Leveling up allows the player to invest a skill point into tank characteristics such as movement speed and bullet damage, allowing players to get an advantage over other players. Players can also upgrade their tank to more powerful classes every 15 levels up until level 45, giving them abilities other tanks may not have. Diep.io features various maps for different game modes, featuring team mechanics such as Free-For-All, Domination, and Tag. The player cannot level up higher than level 45, and players cannot change their tank after selecting their level 45 tank, unless the player is playing the Sandbox gamemode.

ReceptionDiep.io is often praised for its diverse gameplay through its different game modes and tank upgrades.

Maddy Cohen of Screen Rant ranked Diep.io as the best video game using the .io domain, stating that the game is "truly the creme de la creme of .io games," and that it can keep players online for hours. Cohen complimented the game's diverse gameplay offered by its different game modes and tank customization. Anthony Coyle of Gazette Review listed Diep.io as one of the top five games similar to Slither.io, a 2016 massively multiplayer online game. John Corpuz of Tom's Guide listed Diep.io as the third best ".io" game, behind Slither.io and Agar.io, praising its "reasonably involved upgrade system", "good replay value", and "reasonable depth." Arjun Sha of Beebom ranked Diep.io as one of the twelve best alternative games to Agar.io, praising the game's teaming features and recommending the game for readers. Disha of Player.One described Diep.io as "very simple, yet extremely addictive," stating that the game's success is not a coincidence.Agar.io, Slither.io, and Diep.io are popular ".io games," and have been mentioned together by John Corpuz of Tom's Guide and Disha of Player.One''.
The ability to upgrade tanks as well as stats allows many different game strategies and playing styles.

There have been remakes such as arras.io and scenexe.io, which try to introduce a new take to the game.

References

External links
 
 Official wiki

Android (operating system) games
IOS games
Multiplayer video games
2016 video games
Browser games
Free-to-play video games
Action video games
Video games developed in Brazil
.io video games
Browser-based multiplayer online games
Tank simulation video games